An Edirectory or Novell eDirectory (formerly known as Novell Directory Services, sometimes referred to as Netware Directory Services)

Edirectory also may refer to:

 Directory service for accessing and maintaining distributed information services over a computer network
 Network Information Service, a type of directory service
 Online business directory software